John Polanyi Collegiate Institute (JPCI), formerly Sir Sandford Fleming Secondary School is a public high school in  Toronto, Ontario, Canada. It is housed in the former Bathurst Heights Secondary School building. It is located in the North York district, near Lawrence Avenue West and Allen Road in the area of Lawrence Heights community. Prior to 1998, the school was part of the North York Board of Education.

It is a semestered school offering a "full range of university, college and apprenticeship programs." The school was originally named after the Scottish-Canadian inventor of time zones Sandford Fleming.

History 
Sir Sandford Fleming Secondary School was constructed and opened in September 1964. The building shares the same design as Newtonbrook Secondary School. The teams name was known as the Chargers. On September 6, 2011, the school was renamed to John Polanyi Collegiate Institute with the Fleming staff and students moved into the former Bathurst Heights Secondary School on Lawrence and Allen.

Origins of Bathurst Heights  
Bathurst Heights Secondary School opened on September 4, 1951, as North York's second high school (the first being Earl Haig Secondary School) and officially opened on May 29, 1952. Six additions were made throughout the years and adult education was introduced before its program being abolished in 2000. After years of enrollment declining, Bathurst Heights closed its doors as a regular operating school on June 23, 2001.

In 2004 the school was used in the filming of the Zero Hour episode: Massacre at Columbine High.

In the 2000s, the Toronto Catholic District School Board used the Bathurst Heights building to house the students from Brebeuf College School during re-construction and later Dante Alighieri Academy Beatrice Campus.

The former school's building is now leased out by the Toronto District School Board to several tenants:
 Swim camp
 Toronto ESL Learning Centre

Notable alumni (Bathurst Heights)
Rosalie Abella, justice of the Supreme Court of Canada
Denham Brown, basketball player
Paul Godfrey, municipal politician and newspaper publisher
Urjo Kareda, late theatre and music critic
David Shiner, municipal politician
Bob Nevin, late hockey player

References 

High schools in Toronto
Schools in the TDSB
Educational institutions established in 1964
1964 establishments in Ontario
Toronto District School Board